Alabama is an American country, southern rock and bluegrass band formed in Fort Payne, Alabama, in 1969. Alabama's biggest success came in the 1980s, where the band had over 43 number one hits, seven multi-platinum albums and received numerous awards.

Alabama are the most awarded band in the history of country music, with over 200 awards from a variety of organizations. In 1981, Alabama won both the Vocal Group of the Year and Instrumental Group of the Year honors from the Country Music Association (CMA). It also won the Academy of Country Music (ACM)'s Vocal Group of the Year award, and Billboard New Group of the Year honors. The group won the CMA's prestigious Entertainer of the Year award for three consecutive years (1982–84), and the ACM's Entertainer of the Year award five times (1982–86). In 1989, Alabama was named Artist of the Decade by the ACM. In addition, Alabama has also received the NARM Gift of Music award, the Alabama Hall of Fame Distinguished Service award, the Country Radio Broadcasters Humanitarian Award, the Prince Matchabelli National Hero Award, the Bob Hope Humanitarian Award, and a star on the Hollywood Walk of Fame.

Award shows

Academy of Country Music Awards
The Academy of Country Music Awards were first held in 1966, and was the first country music awards program held by a major organization. Alabama has received 15 awards out of 49 nominations. 

|-
| 1981 ||rowspan="3"| Alabama ||rowspan="2"| Vocal Group of the Year ||rowspan=4 
|-
|rowspan="3"| 1982
|-
| Entertainer of the Year
|-
| Feels So Right ||rowspan="2"| Album of the Year
|- 
|rowspan="4"| 1983 || Mountain Music ||rowspan=2 
|-
|rowspan="4"| Alabama || Band of the Year (Touring)
|-
| Entertainer of the Year ||rowspan=8 
|-
|rowspan="2"| Vocal Group of the Year
|-
|rowspan="3"| 1984
|-
| Entertainer of the Year
|-
| The Closer You Get... ||rowspan="2"| Album of the Year
|- 
|rowspan="5"| 1985 || Roll On
|-
|rowspan="3"| Alabama || Entertainer of the Year
|-
| Vocal Group of the Year 
|- 
| Band of the Year (Touring) ||rowspan=4 
|-
| "When We Make Love" || Single Record of the Year
|-
|rowspan="4"| 1986 || "40-Hour Week" || Video of the Year
|-
| 40-Hour Week || Album of the Year
|-
|rowspan="5"| Alabama || Vocal Group of the Year ||rowspan=2 
|-
|rowspan="2"| Entertainer of the Year
|-
|rowspan="4"| 1987 ||rowspan=11 
|-
| Vocal Group of the Year 
|-
| Band of the Year (Touring) 
|-
| "Touch Me When We're Dancing" || Single Record of the Year
|-
|rowspan="3"| 1988 || "Tar Top" || Video of the Year
|-
|rowspan="7"| Alabama || Entertainer of the Year 
|-
|rowspan="2"| Vocal Group of the Year 
|-
|rowspan="2"| 1989
|-
|rowspan="2"| Entertainer of the Year 
|-
|rowspan="4"| 1990
|-
| Vocal Group of the Year 
|-
| Artist of the Decade (1980s) || 
|-
| "High Cotton" ||rowspan="2"| Video of the Year ||rowspan=14 
|-
|rowspan="4"| 1991 || "Pass It on Down"
|-
| "Jukebox in My Mind" || Single Record of the Year
|-
| Pass It on Down || Album of the Year
|-
|rowspan="8"| Alabama ||rowspan="4"| Vocal Group of the Year 
|-
| 1992
|-
| 1993
|-
|rowspan="2"| 1995
|-
| Entertainer of the Year 
|-
| 1996 || Top Vocal Group
|-
| 1998 ||rowspan="2"| Vocal Duo or Group of the Year 
|-
| 1999
|-
| 2000 || "(God Must Have Spent) A Little More Time on You" (shared with 'N Sync) || Vocal Event of the Year
|-
| 2001 ||rowspan="4"| Alabama || Vocal Group of the Year 
|-
| 2003 || Pioneer Award || 
|-
| 2004 || Top Vocal Group || 
|-
| 2005 || 40th Anniversary Award of Merit || 
|-
| 2014 || Alabama || Career Achievement Award ||

American Music Awards
The American Music Awards is an annual awards ceremony created by Dick Clark in 1973. Alabama received their first award in 1984, collecting 18 American Music Awards in total out of 30 nominations. In 2003, Alabama received the Academy's prestigious Award of Merit.

|-
|rowspan="3"|  || Alabama || Favorite Country Band/Duo/Group ||rowspan=4 
|-
| "Feels So Right" || Favorite Country Single
|-
| Feels So Right ||rowspan=2| Favorite Country Album
|-
|rowspan="2"|  || Mountain Music
|-
|rowspan="2"| Alabama ||rowspan="2"| Favorite Country Band/Duo/Group ||rowspan=4 
|-
|rowspan="4"| 
|-
| The Closer You Get... || Favorite Country Album
|-
|rowspan="2"| "Dixieland Delight" || Favorite Country Video
|-
| Favorite Country Single ||rowspan=2 
|- 
|rowspan="2"|  || Roll On || Favorite Country Album 
|-
|rowspan="2"| Alabama ||rowspan="2"| Favorite Country Band/Duo/Group ||rowspan=3 
|-
|rowspan="5"| 
|-
| 40-Hour Week || Favorite Country Album
|-
| "40 Hour Week" || Favorite Country Video ||rowspan=3 
|-
| "There's No Way" || Favorite Country Single
|-
| Alabama ||rowspan="2"| Favorite Country Band/Duo/Group Video Artist 
|-
|rowspan="3"|  ||rowspan="2"| Alabama ||rowspan=5 
|-
| Favorite Country Band/Duo/Group 
|-
| Greatest Hits || Favorite Country Album
|-
|  ||rowspan="2"| Alabama ||rowspan="2"| Favorite Country Band/Duo/Group 
|-
|rowspan="2"|
|-
|"Fallin' Again" ||rowspan="2"| Favorite Country Single ||rowspan=2 
|-
|rowspan="2"|  || "If I Had You"
|-
|rowspan="10"| Alabama ||rowspan="9"| Favorite Country Band/Duo/Group ||rowspan=10 
|-
|  
|-
|  
|-
|  
|-
|  
|-
|  
|-
|  
|-
|  
|-
|  
|-
|  || Award of Merit
|-

American Country Awards
The American Country Awards is an annual country music awards show, entirely voted on by fans online. Created in 2010 by the Fox Network, the awards honor country music artists for singles, albums, music videos and touring categories. Alabama has received the Hitmaker Award, and has had one previous nomination.

|-
| 2011 || "Old Alabama" (shared with Brad Paisley) || Single of the Year: Vocal Collaboration || 
|-
| 2012 || Alabama || Hitmaker Award ||

Billboard Awards
The Billboard Music Awards, sponsored by Billboard magazine, was one of several annual United States music awards shows (among the others are the Grammy Awards, the American Music Awards and the Rock and Roll Hall of Fame Induction Ceremony). Alabama has received one award.

|-
|1990 ||| Alabama || Country Group or Duo || 
|-

BMI Awards
Broadcast Music, Inc. (BMI) is one of three United States performing rights organizations, along with ASCAP and SESAC. It collects license fees on behalf of songwriters, composers, and music publishers and distributes them as royalties to those members whose works have been performed. At the BMI Awards, Alabama has collected two awards.

|-
|1989 || "Fallin' Again" || Song of the Year ||rowspan=2 
|-
|2000 || Alabama || President's Award

Cammy Awards
The Cammy Awards is an award ceremony promoting Carolina beach music, its influences and offshoots. Alabama has received one award.

|-
| 1998 || "Dancin' Shaggin' on the Boulevard" || Beach Music Song of the Year || 
|-

Country Music Association Awards
The Country Music Association Awards, also known as the CMA Awards or CMAs, are presented to country music artists and broadcasters according to voting by CMA members. Alabama has received seven awards out of 40 nominations.

|-
|rowspan="2"| 1980 ||rowspan="5"| Alabama || Vocal Group of the Year ||rowspan=2 
|-
|rowspan="2"| Instrumental Group of the Year 
|-
|rowspan="5"| 1981 ||rowspan=2 
|-
| Vocal Group of the Year
|-
| Entertainer of the Year ||rowspan=5 
|-
| Feels So Right || Album of the Year
|-
| "Old Flame" ||rowspan="2"| Single of the Year
|-
|rowspan="5"| 1982 || "Love in the First Degree"
|-
|Mountain Music || Album of the Year
|-
|rowspan="4"| Alabama || Instrumental Group of the Year ||rowspan=5 
|-
| Vocal Group of the Year
|-
|rowspan="2"|Entertainer of the Year 
|-
|rowspan="4"| 1983
|-
| The Closer You Get... || Album of the Year
|-
|rowspan="4"| Alabama || Instrumental Group of the Year ||rowspan=5 
|-
|rowspan="2"| Vocal Group of the Year
|-
|rowspan="4"| 1984
|-
|Instrumental Group of the Year
|-
| Roll On || Album of the Year
|- 
|rowspan="4"| Alabama ||rowspan="2"| Entertainer of the Year || 
|-
|rowspan="4"| 1985 ||rowspan=19 
|-
| Instrumental Group of the Year
|-
| Vocal Group of the Year 
|-
| 40-Hour Week || Album of the Year
|-
|1987 ||rowspan="14"| Alabama ||rowspan="14"| Vocal Group of the Year
|-
|1988
|-
|1989
|-
|1991
|-
|1992
|-
|1993
|-
|1994
|-
|1996
|-
|1997
|-
|1998
|-
|1999
|-
|2000
|-
|2001
|-
|2003
|-
| 2011 || "Old Alabama" (shared with Brad Paisley) || Musical Event of the Year
|-

GMA Dove Awards
A Dove Award is an accolade by the Gospel Music Association (GMA) of the United States to recognize outstanding achievement in the Christian music industry. The awards are presented at an annual ceremony called the GMA Dove Awards.  Alabama received two nominations.

|-
|2007 ||| Songs of Inspiration ||rowspan="2"| Country Album of the Year ||rowspan=2 
|-
|2008 ||| Songs of Inspiration II
|-

Grammy Awards
The Grammy Awards (originally called the Gramophone Awards) — or Grammys — are presented annually by the National Academy of Recording Arts and Sciences of the United States for outstanding achievements in the music industry. The awards ceremony features performances by prominent artists, and some of the awards of more popular interest are presented in a widely viewed televised ceremony.
Since 1982, Alabama has won a total of two Grammy Awards from 13 nominations throughout their career.

|-
| 
|"Feels So Right" 
| rowspan="11"| Best Country Performance by a Duo or Group with Vocal
| 
|-
|  || "Mountain Music"||rowspan=2 
|-
|  || "The Closer You Get"
|-
|  || "If You're Gonna Play in Texas (You Gotta Have a Fiddle in the Band)"||rowspan=10 
|-
|  || "Can't Keep a Good Man Down"
|-
|  || "She and I"
|-
|  || "Jukebox in My Mind"
|-
|  || "Forever's as Far as I'll Go"
|-
|  || "American Pride"
|-
|  || "Dancin', Shaggin' on the Boulevard"
|-
|  || "How Do You Fall In Love"
|-
|  || "(God Must Have Spent) A Little More Time on You" (shared with 'N Sync)
| Best Country Collaboration with Vocals
|-
|  || "Twentieth Century"
| Best Country Performance by a Duo or Group with Vocal

NARM Awards
The National Association of Recording Merchandisers is a United States not-for-profit trade association that serves music retailing businesses in lobbying and trade promotion. Alabama won six awards from the organization.

|-
|1981 || Feels So Right ||rowspan="5"| Best-Selling Album ||rowspan=6 
|-
|1982 || Mountain Music
|-
|1983 || The Closer You Get...
|-
|1984 || Roll On
|-
|1985 || 40-Hour Week
|-
|??? || Alabama || Gift of Music Award
|-

National Association Of Record Merchandisers Gift Of Music Awards
The National Association Of Record Merchandisers Gift Of Music Awards, now known as the Music Business Association, is a United States not-for-profit trade association based in Marlton, New Jersey that seeks to advance and promote music commerce, whether physical, digital, mobile, or more. Alabama has received five awards.

|-
| 1981 || Feels So Right ||rowspan="5"| Best Selling Country Album by Group ||rowspan=5 
|-
| 1983 || The Closer You Get...
|-
| 1984 || Roll On
|-
| 1985 || 40-Hour Week
|-
| 1986 || Greatest Hits
|-

People's Choice Awards
The People's Choice Awards is an awards show recognizing the people and the work of popular culture. The show has been held annually since 1975 and is claimed to be based on the opinions of the general public. Alabama received two awards out of three nomination.

|-
|1987 ||rowspan="3"| Alabama ||rowspan="2"| Favorite Musical Group ||rowspan=2 
|-
|1993
|-
|2004 || Favorite Musical Group or Band  || 
|-

TNN Awards
The TNN Awards were annual award ceremony honoring country music presented by The Nashville Network. Alabama received one award.

|-
| 2000 || Alabama || Minnie Pearl Humanitarian Award || 
|-

Additional awards and honors

Academy of Television Arts and Sciences

|-
|| 1987 || Alabama || Bob Hope Humanitarian Award For Public Service Work and Contributions Involving Children || 
|-

Ampex

|-
|| 1987 || The Touch ||rowspan="2"| Golden Reel Award ||rowspan=2 
|-
| 1988 || Just Us
|-

Amusement & Music Operators of America

|-
|1982 || Alabama || Most Popular Artist Of The Year || 
|-

Auburn University

|-
| 2003 || Alabama || International Quality of Life Award || 
|-

BMG

|-
| 1989 || Alabama || Global Achievement Award || 
|-

Country Radio Broadcasters

|-
| 1990 ||rowspan="2"| Alabama || Humanitarian Award ||rowspan=2 
|-
| 2004 || Career Achievement Award
|-

Entertainment Radio Network

|-
| 1998 || Alabama || Best Group or Duo || 
|-

Hollywood Walk of Fame
The Hollywood Walk of Fame is a sidewalk along Hollywood Boulevard and Vine Street in Hollywood, California, USA, that serves as an entertainment hall of fame. It is embedded with more than 2,000 five-pointed stars featuring the names of celebrities honored by the Hollywood Chamber of Commerce for their contributions to the entertainment industry.

|-
|| 1998 ||| Alabama || Hollywood Walk of Fame Star ||

Nashville Association of Talent Directors

|-
| 2011 || Alabama || NATD Honoree || 
|-

National Association For Campus Activities

|-
|| 1987 ||rowspan="2"| Alabama || Favorite Country Music Performer ||rowspan=2 
|-
|| 1988 || Vocal Group Of The Year
|-

Prince Matchabelli National Hero Award

|-
| 1990 || Alabama || Music || 
|-

Recording Industry Association of America

|-
| 1999 || Alabama || Country Group of the Century || 
|-

State of Alabama

|-
| 2003 || Alabama || Spirit of Alabama Medal || 
|-

United Service Organizations

|-
|2003 ||rowspan="2"| Alabama || USO Rising Star Award ||rowspan=2 
|-
|2004 || Washington Merit Award
|-

Inductions

Alabama Music Hall Of Fame

|-
|1988 ||rowspan="3"| Alabama || Distinguished Service Award ||rowspan=3 
|-
|1990 || Service Award
|-
|1993 || Life Work Award For Performing Achievement
|-

Country Music Hall of Fame and Museum

|-
|2005 || Alabama || Induction || 
|-

Vocal Group Hall of Fame

|-
|2004 || Alabama || Induction || 
|-

Musicians Hall of Fame 
life time achievement award
2019

Magazine awards

Billboard
The Billboard Music Awards, sponsored by Billboard magazine, was one of several annual United States music awards shows (among the others are the Grammy Awards, the American Music Awards and the Rock and Roll Hall of Fame Induction Ceremony).

|-
| 1981 ||rowspan="6"| Alabama || New Group of the Year ||rowspan=27 
|-
|rowspan="6"| 1982 || Group Of The Year
|-
| Top Singles Group
|-
| Top Album Artist
|-
| Top Group Of The Year - Album and Singles
|-
| Top Artists Of The Year - Album and Singles
|-
| Feels So Right ||rowspan="2"| Top Album
|-
|rowspan="5"| 1983 || Mountain Music
|-
|rowspan="19"| Alabama || Overall Top Artist
|-
| Overall Top Group
|-
| Top Album Artist
|-
| Top Album Group
|-
|rowspan="6"| 1984 || Overall Top Country Artist - Albums and Singles
|-
| Overall Top Country Group - Albums and Singles
|-
| Top Album Group
|-
| Top Album Artist
|-
| Top Singles Group
|-
| Bill Williams Artist Of The Year
|- 
|rowspan="5"| 1985 || Top Artist for Singles and Albums
|-
| Top Group for Singles and Albums
|- 
| Top Singles Artist
|- 
| Top Group for Singles
|-
| Top Group for Albums
|-
|rowspan="3"| 1986 || Top Overall Vocal Group - Singles and Albums
|-
| Top Overall Album Artist 
|-
| Top Overall Album Group
|-
| 1989 || Country Artist of the '80's
|-

Cashbox

|-
|rowspan="2"| 1980 ||rowspan="14"| Alabama || New Vocal Group Of The Year - Singles ||rowspan=22 
|-
|New Vocal Group Of The Year - Albums
|-
|rowspan="3"| 1981 || Top Vocal Group Of The Year - Albums
|-
| Top Vocal Group Of The Year - Singles
|-
| Top Group - Singles
|-
|rowspan="3"| 1982 || Top Vocal Group Of The Year - Singles
|-
|Top Group Of The Year - Albums
|-
|Male Entertainer of The Year
|-
|rowspan="4"| 1983 || Single of the Year
|-
|Group Of The Year
|-
|Vocal Group Of The Year - Singles
|-
| Top Vocal Group Of The Year - Albums
|-
|rowspan="3"| 1984 || Singles Award - Vocal Group
|-
| Album Award - Vocal Group
|-
| Roll On || Top 50 Country Albums
|-
|rowspan="2"| 1985 || 40-Hour Week || #1 Album
|-
|rowspan="6"| Alabama || #1 Group
|-
|rowspan="2"| 1986 || Entertainer Of The Year
|-
|Album - Group Of The Year
|-
| 1987 || Country Vocal Group Of The Year
|-
|rowspan="2"| 1989 || Entertainer Of The Year
|-
|Artist Of The Decade
|-

Cashbox Programmers Choice Awards

|-
|rowspan="2"| 1982 || Alabama || Vocal Group of the Year ||rowspan=7 
|-
|Mountain Music ||rowspan="2"| Album Of The Year
|-
|rowspan="2"| 1983 || The Closer You Get... 
|-
|rowspan="2"|Alabama ||| Group Of The Year
|-
|1985 || Programmers Choice Award
|-

Country Weekly

|-
|rowspan="2"| 2003 ||rowspan="2"| Alabama || Fan Favorite Award ||rowspan=2 
|-
| Favorite Group
|-

Music City News Awards
Beginning in 1967, the Music City News Awards were presented yearly by the now-defunct Music City News magazine. Today, it is known as the CMT Music Awards.

|-
|rowspan="2"| 1982 || Feels So Right || Album of the Year ||rowspan=9 
|-
|rowspan="4"| Alabama ||rowspan="2"| Band of the Year
|- 
|rowspan="2"| 1983
|-
|Vocal Group of the Year
|-
|rowspan="2"| 1984 || Band of the Year
|-
| The Closer You Get... || Album of the Year
|-

Playboy

|-
|rowspan="2"|1990 || Southern Star || Country Album Of The Year ||rowspan=3 
|-
|rowspan="2"| Alabama || Top Group/Country Award
|-
| 1993 || Top Country Group

Radio & Records

|-
|rowspan="2"| 1981 || Alabama || Group Of The Year ||rowspan=15 
|-
| Feels So Right ||rowspan="2"| Album of the Year
|-
|rowspan="3"| 1982 || Mountain Music
|-
|rowspan="3"| Alabama || Group Of The Year
|-
|rowspan="2"| Performers Of The Year
|-
|rowspan="2"| 1983
|- 
|The Closer You Get... ||rowspan="2"| Album of the Year
|-
|rowspan="2"| 1984 || Roll On
|-
|rowspan="5"|Alabama ||rowspan="2"| Performers Of The Year
|-
|rowspan="6"| 1985 
|-
| Performers of the Year (readers' poll)
|-
|Group Of The Year
|-
|Best Group
|-
|rowspan="2"| 40-Hour Week || Best Album (readers' poll)
|-
| Album of the Year
|-

Us Weekly

|-
| 1982 ||rowspan="2"| Alabama ||rowspan="2"| Favorite Country Group ||rowspan=2 
|-
| 1983
|-

References

External links
The band's official website, with an abbreviated list of awards and achievements

Awards
Lists of awards received by American musician
Lists of awards received by musical group